The Alexander Kolyaskin Memorial is a tennis tournament held in Donetsk, Ukraine since 2002. The event is part of the ''challenger series and is played on outdoor hard courts.

Past finals

Singles

Doubles

External links 
Official website
ITF search 

ATP Challenger Tour
Tennis tournaments in Ukraine
Hard court tennis tournaments
Recurring sporting events established in 2002
2002 establishments in Ukraine
Recurring sporting events disestablished in 2008
Sport in Donetsk